is a subway station on the Osaka Metro Midōsuji Line in Abeno-ku, Osaka, Japan, south east of Tennoji. The station is numbered "M24".

While situated relatively close to Fuminosato Station on the Tanimachi Line, there are no transfer passageways between the two stations.

Lines

Station layout
There are two side platforms with two tracks under Abiko-suji, on the second basement ("B2F") level.

Platforms

History
The station opened on 20 December 1951.

Passenger statistics
In fiscal 2011, the station was used by an average of 22,741 passengers daily.

Surrounding area
The station is located in a largely residential area; there are convenience stores, small izakayas, and a covered shopping street of local independent traders.

 Fuminosato Station (Tanimachi Line)
Okazakiya
Momogaike Park
Shodokan Aikido Hombu Dojo (the head dojo of Shodokan Aikido)

See also
 List of railway stations in Japan

References

External links 

 

Abeno-ku, Osaka
Osaka Metro stations
Railway stations in Japan opened in 1951